Daniel Parker is an English make-up artist. He was nominated for an Academy Award in the category Best Makeup and Hairstyling for the film Mary Shelley's Frankenstein.

Selected filmography 
 Mary Shelley's Frankenstein (1994; co-nominated with Paul Engelen and Carol Hemming)

References

External links 

Living people
Year of birth missing (living people)
Place of birth missing (living people)
British make-up artists